The dwarf jay (Cyanolyca nanus) is a species of bird in the family Corvidae. It is endemic to Mexico. Its natural habitat is subtropical or tropical moist montane forests, specifically comprising an oak-pine mix. As its name would imply, this is the smallest member of the family Corvidae at 20–23 cm long and weighing 41 g. It is threatened by habitat loss.

References

dwarf jay
Endemic birds of Mexico
Birds of Mexico
dwarf jay
dwarf jay
Taxonomy articles created by Polbot